Argote is a surname. Notable people with this name include:

 Agustín Argote (1926–1996), Spanish boxer
 Carmen Argote (born 1981), Mexican-American performance artist and sculptor
 Estanislao Argote (born 1956), Spanish footballer
 Francisco de Santillán y Argote, 17th-century governor of Margarita (now Venezuela)
 Gonzalo Argote de Molina (1548–1596), Spanish historian
 José Argote (born 1980), Venezuelan football referee
 Juan Argote (born 1906), Bolivian footballer
 Linda Argote, American industrial and organizational psychologist
 Luis de Góngora y Argote, 16th-17th century Spanish poet